Teatro Colombo is a theatre and cinema in São Paulo, Brazil.

References

Theatres in São Paulo